Milnrow is a town in the Metropolitan Borough of Rochdale, Greater Manchester, England, and it is unparished.  The town, with its suburb of Newhey and the surrounding countryside, contains 49 listed buildings that are recorded in the National Heritage List for England.  Of these, three are listed at Grade II*, the middle grade, and the others are at Grade II, the lowest grade.  Until the Industrial Revolution the area was rural and agricultural and most of the earlier listed buildings are houses and associated structures, farmhouses and farm buildings.  When the textile industry arrived, it was initially carried out in domestic premises, and many of the listed buildings of this time are houses, often with three storeys and rows of multi-light mullioned weavers' workshop windows in the upper floors.  Later came mills, one of which has survived and is listed.  The other listed buildings include a public house, a bridge, churches and items in churchyards, a library and a war memorial.


Key

Buildings

References

Citations

Sources

Lists of listed buildings in Greater Manchester
Buildings and structures in the Metropolitan Borough of Rochdale